Paharpur is a census town in Gaya district in the Indian state of Bihar.

Demographics

 India census, Paharpur had a population of 5758. Males constitute 68% of the population and females 32%. Paharpur has an average literacy rate of 78%, higher than the national average of 59.5%: male literacy is 84%, and female literacy is 64%. In Paharpur, 13% of the population is under 6 years of age.

References

Cities and towns in Gaya district